The Mohamed Noah Foundation Mosque is the only mosque in Genting Highlands, Pahang, Malaysia. It was opened in 1981. This mosque also acts as the rest area for Muslims to perform their prayers during, before or after vacation to Genting Highlands. It was named after Tan Sri Mohammad Noah, a Malaysian politician and he was among the founders of Genting Highlands after Tan Sri Lim Goh Tong.

See also
 Islam in Malaysia

References

Mosques in Pahang
Genting Highlands
Mosques completed in 1981
1981 establishments in Malaysia